Epigynopteryx maeviaria is a moth of the  family Geometridae. It is found in subtropical Africa and is known from Angola, Congo, Kenya, Malawi, South Africa, Tanzania and Zimbabwe.

The basic colour of this species is dirty light ochreous-yellow, sprayed with black.

Subspecies
Epigynopteryx maeviaria maeviaria (Guenée, 1858) - from Congo and South Africa
Epigynopteryx maeviaria triseriata (Bastelberger, 1907) - from Kenya, Congo and Tanzania

References

External links
Pictures at boldsystems.org

Ennominae
Moths described in 1858
Lepidoptera of Angola
Lepidoptera of Malawi
Lepidoptera of Tanzania
Lepidoptera of Zimbabwe
Moths of Sub-Saharan Africa